Riders in the Sky is an American live-action/animated children's television series starring western/comedy band Riders in the Sky. It aired on CBS in 1991.

Cast 
 Riders in the Sky – themselves:
 Douglas B. Green – Ranger Doug
 Paul Chrisman – Woody Paul
 Fred LaBour – Too Slim
 Joey Miskulin – Joey The Cow-Polka King
 Al Rodrigo – Senor Senor
 Patrick Bristow – Sourdough

Puppeteers
Julianne Buescher
Kevin Carlson
Too Slim - Two Jaws
Wayne White - Harry Coyote

Production

Development 
Riders in the Sky was originally pitched as a sitcom in which the Riders moved from a frontier town in the American west to Hollywood, California, with most of the humor of the series coming from the trio being "fish out of water". The idea was unappealing to television executives due to the premise sounding too similar to that of The Beverly Hillbillies, and the show was passed on. Later, producer Alan Sacks developed the idea of a children's show starring the Riders and pitched it to CBS executives, who after seeing the Riders perform, were immediately interested.

Writing and filming 
CBS assigned George McGrath to write the series, although Sacks would later say, "that was a big mistake, we should have had the Riders writing." The series began taping on July 17 and wrapped up on September 14, 1991, the same day it premiered.

Crew 
 Puppets by the Puppet Studio
 Producers - Chris Plourde, George McGrath, Alan Sacks
 Costume Designers – Jacqueline Saint Anne, Roberta Samet
 Camera Operator – Keeth Lawrence
 Animatronic Puppeteer – Kirk Skodis
 Sound Mixer- Laura King
 Sound Effects Editor – Chris Trent
 Videotape – Scott Tuchman

Tie-in album 

A few weeks before the series premiered, Riders in the Sky released Harmony Ranch, their second children's album and their first on the Columbia Records label. The album features characters from the show on the cover and takes its name from the Riders' home in the series.

Episodes 
 Saddle Pals (September 14, 1991)
 Harmony Ranch (September 21, 1991)
 Horsenapped (September 28, 1991)
 Save the Buffalo (October 5, 1991)
 Cook Out (October 12, 1991)
 Sourdough's Surprise (October 19, 1991)
 Muley's Revenge (October 26, 1991)
 Trail Weevils (November 2, 1991)
 Fool's Gold (November 9, 1991)
 Bad Brothers (November 16, 1991)
 Curse of the Mine (November 23, 1991)
 The Contraption (November 30, 1991)
 Mail Order Brides (December 7, 1991)

Home video releases 
The series has never been officially released on any home media, either physical or digital, due to rights issues. This was revealed while answering a question for the "Youth Wants To Know" article on the Riders in the Sky website, with "Ranger Doug" Green stating that "far too many people have a little piece of that series to make a video viable".

Awards 
 Daytime Emmy for Outstanding Achievement in Costume Design – Won

References

External links

1990s American children's comedy television series
1990s American musical comedy television series
1991 American television series debuts
1991 American television series endings
American children's musical television series
American television series with live action and animation
American television shows featuring puppetry
CBS original programming
English-language television shows
Television series based on singers and musicians